Call Me a Liar is a 1961 Australian TV play. It was shot in Melbourne in studio with some location work. It was Channel 2's 49th live play.

Plot
Sammy Moles lives in a world of make believe. For his employer's benefit he invents a wife and child and for his fellow lodgers he lies about his past, background and job. He meets a German girl called Martha.

Cast
David Mitchell as Sammy Moles
Jane Oehr as Martha
Barbara Brandon as landlady		
Campbell Copelin as man on park bench
Rose du Clos as lady boarder		
Ken Goodlet as Mr Pheeming
Joe Jenkins as Dr Bowker
James Lynch as solitary drinker
Stewart Weller as street musician
Ligia Monamis as Indian girl
Nancy Cato and Peter Oliver as English couple		
Abdul Ghani as an African
Ron Pinnell as father
Reginald Newsom as businessman
Cecile Glass as Finnish girl
Margherita Kean as bar girl
Shirley Young as mother

Production

It was based on a TV play by John Mortimer which had been performed in England in 1958. It was also adapted for Australian radio in 1961. The play was filmed again for British TV in 1963.

William Sterling gave the lead to Jane Oehr, a 19 year old second year university arts student who was relatively inexperienced as an actor. She had been in Macbeth and Night of the Ding Don. David Mitchell has been in both those productions as well, along with Who Killed Kovali?, Shadow of Heroes and The Astronauts.

Reception
The Sydney Morning Herald TV critic said the production "had the lightness of heart and the deftness of touch so necessary to such a whimsical part-comedy, part-sentimental drama."

References

External links
 

1961 television plays
Australian television films
1960s Australian television plays
Films directed by William Sterling (director)